Thamnocephalidae is a family of crustaceans with wide distribution including Western Australia, Southern Africa and South America. It was originally described as a subfamily of Branchipodidae by Alpheus Spring Packard in 1883, and elevated to the rank of family by Simon in 1886. Six genera are recognised, in two subfamilies:
Thamnocephalinae
Thamnocephalus Packard, 1879
Carinophallus Rogers, 2006
Branchinellinae
Dendrocephalus Daday, 1908
Phallocryptus Birabén, 1951
Spiralifrons Dixon, 2010
Branchinella Sayce, 1903

References

Anostraca
Crustacean families
Taxa named by Alpheus Spring Packard